Whitefield Castle is a ruined L-plan tower-house on the hill above the village of Kirkmichael, in Strathardle, Perth and Kinross, Scotland.

History
Built in the 12th century by Malcolm Canmore as a hunting lodge, it was expanded in 1577 by the Spalding family. It is now ruinous.

The castle also has a ley tunnel legend, a tradition often found associated with ancient residences. This tunnel was said to link up with nearby Ashintully Castle.

References

Castles in Perth and Kinross
Hunting lodges in Scotland
Buildings and structures completed in the 12th century
12th-century establishments in Scotland